Noko Jeans was a fashion company. Active 2007–2011, founded by Jacob Åström, Tor Rauden Källstigen and Jakob Ohlsson. It is the first foreign company to import jeans from North Korea.

Criticism 
In December 2007, Noko's founders gave a North Korean delegation two sample pairs of jeans for inspection at a textile factory in Pyongyang. When Noko Jeans launched the sales of their first collection in December 2009,  criticism was aimed at the brand because of the sourcing of jeans from the North Korean regime. The founders of Noko Jeans defended themselves, saying that they had been present at the factory during production and documented it to guarantee that no child labor had been used, and that workers had working conditions that were in compliance with international standards. The controversy prompted the Swedish retail store PUB to withdraw the jeans from their shelves.

Design 
The two unisex models were designed in collaboration with fashion designer Julia Hederus. Both models are designed based on the Noko Jeans story.

Kara Slim Fit is a tighter model with a regular waste.

Oke Loose Fit is more baggy, with a drop-crotch. Oke Loose Fit has a regular waste.

Production 
The production were made by a mining company in Pyongyang during the summer of 2009

In total 1100 pieces were made. Each pair of jeans cost 1,500 kronor (£131), coming in two styles-the slim-fit Kara and loose-fit Oke, both of which were made in black denim.

Sales and marketing 
The pants were sold through Noko Jeans' online store, as well as briefly in the Noko Jeans Museum in Stockholm.  The Noko Jeans Museum was opened in Stockholm, Sweden, December 5, 2009, when the PUB department store refused to continue selling the  jeans, worried that they would become involved in the current public debate regarding the ethics of selling clothes produced in North Korea.

From December 18, 2009 to February 6, 2010, Noko Jeans had a museum in Södermalm, Stockholm.

References

External links 
 The Guardian — “Denim diplomacy: North Korea exports jeans to Sweden”
 New York Times — “North Korea-Made Designer Jeans Launched in Sweden”
 The Huffington Post — "Denim Diplomacy"
 Official Website (Now defunct) - archived version here
 Official Photo Gallery (Flickr)

Clothing brands
Clothing companies of Sweden
Jeans by brand
Economy of North Korea